USS Austin (DE-15), was an  of the United States Navy during World War II. The ship was named for Chief Carpenter John Arnold Austin (1905-1941) who was killed in action on board  during the attack on Pearl Harbor by Japanese forces on 7 December 1941, and was posthumously awarded the Navy Cross.

The second Austin (DE-15) was laid down on 14 March 1942 at the Mare Island Navy Yard as HMS Blackwood (BDE-15) for the United Kingdom under the terms of the Lend-Lease Agreement; launched on 25 September 1942: sponsored by Mrs. W. C. Springer; taken over by the United States Navy on 25 January 1943 and redesignated DE-15; and commissioned on 13 February 1943. The destroyer escort was apparently commissioned as simply DE-15 for the name Austin was not assigned to her until 19 February 1943, six days after she went into commission.

Namesake
John Arnold Austin was born in Warrior, Alabama on 30 August 1905. He enlisted in the United States Navy on 20 November 1920 at age 15. Between that time and 26 July 1935, he served four successive enlistments. Serving as a Carpenter's Mate 3rd Class (Petty officer third class), he reported on board the submarine tender  then serving as a unit of the Asiatic Fleet. On 4 December 1935, Austin was advanced to Chief Carpenters Mate (Chief Petty Officer). Detached from the heavy cruiser on 13 July 1937 and reported on board  on 10 September 1937. He served in that battleship until detached on 14 June 1939 to proceed to further assignment to  reporting on 18 July 1939. In October 1941, Austin he received a commission as a (Chief Warrant Officer, W-2).

On the morning of 7 December 1941, Austin was on board Oklahoma which was the first ship to be attacked by the Japanese on Battleship Row, it capsized in only 15 minutes due to damage it received from torpedoes and bombs. Austin along with many crew members were trapped within the ship as it keeled over. After searching for a means of escape, he found a porthole beneath the surface that offered a way out. He assisted 15 sailors in escaping from the sunken Oklahoma. However Chief Warrant Officer Carpenter Austin failed to get out.

Austin's remains were originally among those buried in the Halawa Naval Cemetery and Nu'uanu Cemetery on Oahu. After the war concluded, those remains were disinterred as part of an effort to identify individuals. Still unidentified, his were among the remains of 45 crew members from the Oklahoma that were buried under a shared marker at the National Cemetery of the Pacific. New forensic technologies led to the resumption of efforts to identify those remains in 2015. Austin's remains were identified by the Defense POW/MIA Accounting Agency in September 2018.

Navy Cross Citation
The citation for his posthumous Navy Cross reads: 
The President of the United States of America takes pride in presenting the Navy Cross (Posthumously) to Chief Carpenter John Arnold Austin (NSN: 75565), United States Navy, for exceptional courage, presence of mind, and devotion to duty and disregard for his personal safety while serving on board the Battleship U.S.S. OKLAHOMA (BB-37), during the Japanese attack on the United States Pacific Fleet in Pearl Harbor, Territory of Hawaii, on 7 December 1941. When the U.S.S. OKLAHOMA capsized, Chief Carpenter Austin and a number of the crew were entrapped in one of the ship's compartments. By his efforts, a porthole which was under water was located and he assisted fifteen of the crew to escape. The conduct of Chief Carpenter Austin throughout this action reflects great credit upon himself, and was in keeping with the highest traditions of the United States Naval Service. He gallantly gave his life for his country.

Service history
Assigned to Escort Division (CortDiv) 14, the ship conducted shakedown training out of San Diego between 23 March and 23 April 1943. On the latter day, she put to sea to escort a convoy to Cold Bay, Alaska. She returned to San Diego on 11 May and began convoy escort missions between the West Coast and the Hawaiian Islands. Between mid-May and early September, Austin made two round-trip voyages between San Diego and Oahu and then a single, one-way run from the West Coast back to Pearl Harbor. On 2 September the ship left Pearl Harbor for the Aleutian Islands; and, on 14 September, joined the Alaskan Sea Frontier. For just over one year, Austin plied the cold waters of the North Pacific escorting ships between Alaskan ports, conducting patrols, performing weather ship duties, and serving as a homing point for aircraft.

The warship departed Alaska on 23 September 1944; arrived in San Francisco, California, a week later, and received a regular overhaul which lasted until 17 November. On 3 December, she once more weighed anchor for Hawaii. Austin operated out of Pearl Harbor as a training ship with the Pacific Fleet Submarine Training Command until 20 March 1945, when she set out for the Central Pacific. On 1 April, the destroyer escort reported for duty with forces assigned to the Commander, Forward Areas, and, for a little more than two months, conducted anti-submarine patrols and air-sea rescue missions out of Ulithi Atoll in the Western Caroline Islands. She finished that assignment on 10 June when the ship left for the Mariana Islands. For the next four months, Austin operated out of Guam and Saipan. In addition to anti-submarine patrols and air/sea rescue missions, she escorted convoys to such places as Iwo Jima, Eniwetok and Okinawa. Following the cessation of hostilities in mid-August, she conducted search missions in the northern Marianas for enemy holdouts and for survivors of downed B-29 Superfortresses. The warship also patrolled Truk Atoll briefly before occupation forces arrived there in strength.

On 12 October, she departed Guam in company with the other ships of CortDiv 14, bound for San Pedro, California, and inactivation. On 17 November, she reported to the Commander, Western Sea Frontier, to prepare for decommissioning and, on 21 December 1945, was placed out of commission at Terminal Island Naval Shipyard. Austin was berthed with the Pacific Reserve Fleet until scrapped. On 8 January 1946, her name was struck from the Naval Vessel Register. The Terminal Island Naval Shipyard completed scrapping her on 9 January 1947.

Awards

References

External links
 

Evarts-class destroyer escorts
World War II frigates and destroyer escorts of the United States
Ships built in Vallejo, California
1942 ships
Weather ships